The 1964 Wake Forest Demon Deacons football team represented Wake Forest University during the 1964 NCAA University Division football season. In its first season under head coach Bill Tate, the team compiled a 5–5 record and finished in a three-way tie for third place in the Atlantic Coast Conference (ACC).

Three players received first-team All-ACC honors from the Associated Press: fullback Brian Piccolo, quarterback John Mackovic, and end Richard Cameron. Piccolo was a unanimous selection for the all-conference team, and was also selected as a first-team All-American by Football News. He set three ACC records in 1964 with 1,044 rushing yards, 111 points scored, and 17 touchdowns. Piccolo also led the nation in 1964 in rushing yards, rushing touchdowns, and points scored. He was named the Atlantic Coast Conference (ACC) Player of the Year, yet went unselected in both the AFL and NFL drafts. Mackovic led the Demon Deacons with 1,340 passing yards while completing 89 of 195 passes. Cameron caught 29 passes for 410 yards.

Schedule

Team leaders

References

Wake Forest
Wake Forest Demon Deacons football seasons
Wake Forest Demon Deacons football